Zoë Baker (born 29 February 1976) is a former world record holder in swimming who represented Great Britain until 2005, when she switched allegiance to New Zealand whilst living there. She later returned to the United Kingdom and she switched her allegiance back to Great Britain in 2011.

Swimming career

National titles
Baker won the ASA National British Championships 50 metres breaststroke title eight times (1992, 1993, 1997, 1999, 2000, 2001, 2002, 2003).

1999
At the 1999 European Aquatics Championships in Istanbul, Baker swam 31.43 seconds in the semifinal of the 50-m breaststroke to set a European record. She collected a silver medal in the final.

2000
Baker earned the silver medal in the 50-m breaststroke at the 2000 European Aquatics Championships in Helsinki, finishing behind Ágnes Kovács of Hungary.

2001
Baker won the bronze medal in the 50-m breaststroke at the 2001 FINA World Championships in Fukuoka, Japan, finishing with a time of 31.40.

2002
Baker represented England at the 2002 Commonwealth Games in Manchester winning the gold medal in the women's 50 m breaststroke in a time of 30.60 seconds. She also set a world record of 30.57 seconds in the semifinal round of the same event, breaking the previous mark set by Penny Heyns of South Africa. In addition, she set a short-course world record with a mark of 30.53 seconds at the South African National Short Championships in Durban, then surpassed that mark later in the same month.

2003
In 2003 Baker collected another medal in the 50-m breaststroke, a bronze at the 2003 FINA World Aquatics Championships in Barcelona behind Chinese swimmer Luo Xuejuan.

2006
At the 2006 Commonwealth Games in Melbourne she was 4th in the same event, this time representing New Zealand.

2012
In January 2012 Baker switched her allegiance back to Great Britain for international swimming competitions.

Coaching career
Baker was the head coach of the Bournemouth Collegiate School Swimming Academy.
Baker relocated to Australia in 2022 to take up the head coach role at Peel Aquatic Club, located in Mandurah WA.

See also
 World record progression 50 metres breaststroke

References

External links 
 

1976 births
Living people
English female swimmers
New Zealand female swimmers
Female breaststroke swimmers
Swimmers at the 2002 Commonwealth Games
Swimmers at the 2006 Commonwealth Games
Commonwealth Games gold medallists for England
Commonwealth Games competitors for New Zealand
World record setters in swimming
World Aquatics Championships medalists in swimming
Medalists at the FINA World Swimming Championships (25 m)
European Aquatics Championships medalists in swimming
Commonwealth Games medallists in swimming
Medallists at the 2002 Commonwealth Games